Giorgos Koltzos (born 13 September 1976) is a retired Greek footballer, who played as a defender.

Career
Koltzos began playing football with the youth side of Athinaikos F.C. and joined the club's professional team in July 1993. He would spend five seasons in the Greek Superleague with Athinaikos before moving to Paniliakos F.C. in October 1998. Koltzos spent three more seasons in the Superleague with Paniliakos before the club was relegated to the Beta Ethniki.

Koltzos played for Leeds United as a trialist and played for the reserves against Barnsley in October 2006, although did not get a contract with the club.

References

External links
Profile at epae.org
Guardian Football

1976 births
Living people
Footballers from Athens
Greek footballers
Greece under-21 international footballers
Super League Greece players
Athinaikos F.C. players
Paniliakos F.C. players
Apollon Pontou FC players
A.O. Kerkyra players
OFI Crete F.C. players
Veria F.C. players
Levadiakos F.C. players
Thrasyvoulos F.C. players
Association football defenders